The Secret of Helene Marimon (French: Le Secret d'Hélène Marimon) is a 1954 French-Italian  drama film directed by Henri Calef and starring Isa Miranda, Franck Villard and Carla Del Poggio. The scenario was based on the novel of J. B. Cherrier "Les cahiers du conseiller Marimon".

The film's sets were designed by the art director Lucien Aguettand.

Cast 
 Isa Miranda as Hélène Marimon
 Franck Villard as Jacques Taillandier
 Carla Del Poggio as Dominique Marimon
 Jean Debucourt as Camille Marimon
 Noël Roquevert as uncle of Jacques
 André Valmy as Thierry
 Michel Roux as Leflou
 André Versini as Mr Delabarre
 Hella Lexington as Betty
 Hubert Noël as a soldier
 Albert Michel as a convalescent soldier
 Jacques Dynam as Galdou
 Lucienne Granier as Mrs Delabarre
 Jeanne Provost as Mrs Ravan
 Robert Seller as Colonel Brognot
 Robert Allan
 Louis de Funès as Mr. Rachoux, the gardener
 Maurice Biraud
 R.J. Chauffard
 Monique Defrançois
 Gabriel Gobin

References

Bibliography
 Orio Caldiron & Matilde Hochkofler. Isa Miranda. Gremese Editore.

External links 
 
 Le Secret d’Hélène Marimon (1954) at the Films de France

1954 films
French drama films
1950s French-language films
French black-and-white films
Films directed by Henri Calef
Italian drama films
1954 drama films
Films set in the Middle East
Films set in Paris
Films set in 1918
Italian black-and-white films
1950s French films
1950s Italian films